Irving H. Picard (born June 26, 1941) is a partner in the law firm BakerHostetler. He is known for his recovery of funds from the Madoff investment scandal from investors, Bernie Madoff and his family, and their spouses and estates. Under Picard, some of those scammed by Madoff were demanded to pay back money they had previously withdrawn from Madoff's phony fund, re-victimizing some of Madoff's victims, including by suing elderly investors for their IRAs and other accounts. Throughout the ordeal, Picard's law firm was paid approximately $1 billion.

Early life
Picard was born in Fall River, Massachusetts, and is Jewish. His parents were Julius Picard (a doctor born in Lauterbourg, France) and Claire Dreyfuss (born in Kaiserslautern, Germany).

In August 1938, Julius and Claire Picard immigrated with their children from Mainz in Nazi Germany to the United States. They settled in Fall River, where their third son, Irving, was born. Irving's uncle Moritz Cahn, a lawyer in Frankfurt/Main, Germany, committed suicide, with his wife, in 1941 to avoid the concentration camps.

Education and legal career
Picard graduated from the Wharton School, University of Pennsylvania, with a B.S. degree in Economics (1963) from Boston University School of Law with a J.D. degree (1966), and from the New York University School of Law with an LL.M. degree (1967).

In the 1970s, he was variously Assistant General Counsel, Acting Chief Counsel, and Trial Attorney in the Division of Corporate Regulation of the Securities and Exchange Commission. He was admitted to the New York Bar in 1982, and has been in private practice since then. He joined the law firm of BakerHostetler as a partner in 2008.

Recovery of funds from Madoff scandal
In 2008, U.S. District Judge of the Southern District of New York Lawrence McKenna appointed Picard trustee of assets seized by the court from Bernard Madoff. Since then, Picard has led the recovery of funds from the Madoff investment scandal. He and his team have been overseeing the liquidation of Bernard Madoff's firm in bankruptcy court, and have so far recovered over $13 billion — about 76 percent of approved claims — by suing those who profited from the scheme even if those individuals were unaware or uncharged.

Kathy Bazoian Phelps, a lawyer at Diamond McCarthy, said "That kind of recovery is extraordinary and atypical", as clawbacks in such schemes range from 5 percent to 30 percent, and many victims don't get anything. Picard has successfully pursued not only investors, but also spouses and estates of those who profited, such as the widow and estate of the deceased Stanley Chais, and the widow and estate of the deceased Jeffry Picower, with whom he reached a $7.2 billion settlement (the largest civil forfeiture payment in US history). His most notable case was Ruth Madoff, the wife of Bernard Madoff. "You don’t take this job if you're thin-skinned", Picard once said.

References

Bibliography
 Irving Picard: The Lawyer Behind The $10B Haul For Madoff Victims Huffington Post
 Letter to Gene L. Dodaro Comptroller General of the United States Government Accountability Office from Congress requesting probe
 Trustee, SEC Should be Probed -US Reps
 July 27, 2011 Madoff Trustee’s Actions to Be Probed by GAO, Representative Garrett Says

External links
 Profile from Baker Hostetler

1941 births
Living people
20th-century American lawyers
21st-century American Jews
21st-century American lawyers
Place of birth missing (living people)
American people of French-Jewish descent
American people of German-Jewish descent
Boston University School of Law alumni
Jewish American attorneys
New York University School of Law alumni
People associated with BakerHostetler
People associated with the Madoff investment scandal
People from the Bronx
People from Fall River, Massachusetts
Wharton School of the University of Pennsylvania alumni